Politekhnichna is a station on the Kyiv Light Rail. It was opened in 1978.

External links

Kyiv Light Rail stations